Tim Roth (born December 6, 1975) is the guitarist, backing vocalist and only remaining founding member of Canadian melodic death metal and progressive metal band, Into Eternity. Roth is very much the mastermind of Into Eternity, plays the majority of their guitar solos and also was originally the lead vocalist. His primary guitar is an Ibanez S470, and has said that he does not use amplifiers in studio recordings, but uses instead a program called Amp Farm. He has been playing guitar for 32 years. He has a somewhat unconventional style of playing revolved on his unique alternate picking style and sweep/tap arpeggios. His vocal style consists of high pitched clean power metal vocals and a more black metal oriented shriek (complementing the deeper death metal growls of his co-vocalists). He has posted several videos on YouTube teaching viewers how to play Into Eternity songs and IE's musical style in general.

Discography

Into Eternity
 1999/2000: Into Eternity
 2001: Dead or Dreaming
 2004: Buried in Oblivion
 2006: The Scattering of Ashes
 2008: The Incurable Tragedy
 2018: The Sirens

See also
 Stu Block
 Into Eternity

References

External links
 Official Site
 Century Media Records
 Official Into Eternity Myspace Page

1975 births
Living people
Place of birth missing (living people)
Canadian heavy metal guitarists
Canadian male guitarists
21st-century Canadian guitarists
21st-century Canadian male singers